Pigi is a large village in the Trikala regional unit, Thessaly, Greece. It is 9 kilometers (ca. 5–6 miles) west from Trikala on the national road of Trikala-Arta.  The community had 1,227 inhabitants at the 2011 census. Most citizens are farmers but there are also some who work for businesses in Trikala.  Pigi has its own football stadium but also has an off-road sport terrain. Pigi has also an athletic park called Skamnies.

References

Populated places in Trikala (regional unit)